Scopula erubescens is a moth of the  family Geometridae. It is found in India (Khasia Hills).

References

Moths described in 1895
erubescens
Moths of Asia